People with the surname Strait include:

 Bob Strait (born 1949), American stock car racing driver
 Brian Strait (born 1988), American ice hockey defenseman
 Chris Strait (born 1976), American comedian and writer
 Derrick Strait (born 1980), American football player
 Edward M. Strait (1930–2008), American labor leader
 George Strait (born 1952), American country music singer, songwriter, actor, and music producer
 Harold G. Strait (1898–1983), American resident
 Horace B. Strait (1835–1894), American U.S. Representative from Minnesota
 Lynn Strait (1968–1998), American singer and songwriter
 Ralph Strait (1936–1992), American actor
 Robert Strait (born 1969), American football player
 Sonny Strait (born 1965), American voice actor, director, and writer
 Steven Strait (born 1986), American actor and singer
 Thomas J. Strait (1846–1924), American U.S. Representative from South Carolina

See also 
 Strait